Buffalo Springs, Virginia may refer to:
 Buffalo Springs, Mecklenburg County, Virginia
 Buffalo Springs, Nelson County, Virginia